D-class submarine may refer to:

 
 
 
 Japanese Type D submarine, two classes submarines
 I-361-class submarine (Type D1 submarine)
 I-373-class submarine (Type D2 submarine)

Submarine classes